Sadova is a commune located in Suceava County, Romania. It is composed of a single village, Sadova.

References

Communes in Suceava County
Localities in Southern Bukovina